Ancil Elcock (born 17 March 1969) is a retired footballer from Trinidad and Tobago. He played for the MLS (USA's Major League Soccer) team Columbus Crew between 1997 and 2001 (130 games and 7 goals), and for Tobago United. He got 69 caps for the national team between 1994 and 2004. Ancil Elcock became infamous for fracturing  Mexican superstar Cuauhtémoc Blanco in a World Cup qualification match.

Elcock is the older cousin of Stern John, whom he recruited to the Columbus Crew while tenured there.

Blanco's Injury
On October 8, 2000 Trinidad and Tobago contested a World Cup qualification match against Mexico. The match was played on Mexico City on the Estadio Azteca and the referee was Carlos Batros Gonzalez. On the 72nd minute, Elcock slide tackled Blanco hitting him on the knee as he received the ball on the penalty box. Referee Gonzalez determined the tackle to be of excessive force and called for a penalty and ejected Elcock by showing him a direct red card, even though Elcock had previously received a yellow in the game. The penalty was taken and scored by Victor Ruiz resulting in the final score of the game 7–0 in favor of Mexico.

Clubs
 St. Augustine FC
 Malta Carib Alcons
 Columbus Crew
 San Juan Jabloteh
 North East Stars
 Tobago United

References

External links
Bio at socawarriors.net

1969 births
Living people
Trinidad and Tobago footballers
Trinidad and Tobago expatriate footballers
Columbus Crew players
Trinidad and Tobago international footballers
Tobago United F.C. players
San Juan Jabloteh F.C. players
North East Stars F.C. players
TT Pro League players
Major League Soccer players
Expatriate soccer players in the United States
Trinidad and Tobago expatriate sportspeople in the United States
1998 CONCACAF Gold Cup players
2000 CONCACAF Gold Cup players
2002 CONCACAF Gold Cup players
Association football defenders
1996 CONCACAF Gold Cup players